The 1944 United States Senate election in North Carolina was held on November 7, 1944. Incumbent Democratic Senator Robert Rice Reynolds did not run for a third term in office. Former Governor of North Carolina Clyde R. Hoey won the open seat, defeating U.S. Representative Cameron A. Morrison in the Democratic primary and Republican attorney A.I. Ferree in the general election.

Democratic primary

Candidates
Clyde R. Hoey, former Governor of North Carolina (1937–41)
Cameron A. Morrison, U.S. Representative from Charlotte and former Governor and interim U.S. Senator
Giles Y. Newton
Marvin L. Ritch
Arthur Simmons

Results

General election

Results

Footnotes

1944
North C
1944 North Carolina elections